Classic Rock (formerly Rock Classics) was a 24-hour music format produced by Dial Global Networks. Its playlist consists mostly of contemporary classic rock music from artists such as Led Zeppelin, Pink Floyd, Lynyrd Skynyrd and Van Halen, The Rolling Stones. The format was launched in July 1997 by Jones Senior Director of Programming Jon Holiday and has been programmed by Adam Fendrich since 2001.

Although "Rock Classics" wasn't affected by the recent purchased of Jones Radio Networks by Triton Media Group, it was relocated into Dial Global's portfolio and re-branded as "Classic Rock" on December 29, 2008. However, Dial Global's "Adult Rock and Roll" was dissolved to make this happen.

Competitor Networks
The Classic Rock Experience by Citadel Media

External links 
Classic Rock by Dial Global

Classic rock radio stations in the United States
Defunct radio networks in the United States
Radio stations established in 1997 
Radio stations disestablished in 2008
Defunct radio stations in the United States